Kim Jeong-hwan (born 4 January 1997) is a South Korean football forward who plays for Seoul E-Land in K League 2 and the South Korea national under-20 football team.

Club career 
Kim joined FC Seoul in 2016 and made his debut again Buriram United on 20 April 2016 and league debut against Jeonbuk Hyundai Motors on 28 August 2016.

International career 
He has been a member of the South Korea national U-20 team since 2015.

Club career statistics

References

External links
 
 Kim Jeong-hwan– National Team stats at KFA 

1997 births
Living people
Association football forwards
South Korean footballers
FC Seoul players
Gwangju FC players
Seoul E-Land FC players
K League 1 players
K League 2 players
South Korea under-20 international footballers